Sir Richard Wingfield (c. 1456–1525) was an English courtier and diplomat

Richard Wingfield may also refer to:

 Richard Wingfield, 1st Viscount Powerscourt (first creation) (1550–1634), English nobleman
 Richard Wingfield, 1st Viscount Powerscourt (third creation) (1697–1751), MP for Boyle
 Richard Wingfield, 3rd Viscount Powerscourt (1730–1788), Anglo-Irish politician and peer
 Richard Wingfield, 5th Viscount Powerscourt (1790–1823), Viscount Powerscourt
 Richard Wingfield, 6th Viscount Powerscourt (1815–1844), British peer and Conservative Party politician
 Richard Wingfield (MP for Orford) (died c. 1591), Member of Parliament (MP) for Orford
 Richard Wingfield (MP for Portsmouth) (c. 1510-1557/59), MP for Portsmouth

See also
 Richard Wingfield-Baker (1802–1880), MP for South Essex